Emblemaria hudsoni is a species of chaenopsid blenny found around Peru, in the southeast Pacific ocean. It can reach a maximum length of  TL. The specific name honours the Captain Charles Bradford Hudson (1865-1939) of the District of Columbia National Guard, who was an illustrator and who painted many species of American fishes.

References
 Evermann, B.W., and L. Radcliffe, 1917 (1 Aug.) The fishes of the west coast of Peru and the Titicaca Basin. Bulletin of the United States National Museum No. 95: i-xi + 1–166, Pls. 1-14.

hudsoni
Fish described in 1917
Fish of Peru